1979 was a common year in the Gregorian calendar.

1979 may also refer to:

 "1979" (song), a 1996 song by the Smashing Pumpkins
 1979 (novel), a 2001 novel by Christian Kracht